Field hockey at the 2003 Afro-Asian Games was held over a period of eight days, from 23 October to 31 October 2003. It was one of the two sports which started before the opening ceremony of the Games, the other being football. The medal ceremonies were held on 30 October (women) and 31 October (men). All events took place at the Gachibowli Hockey Stadium, Hyderabad, India.

Competition

Eight teams each for the men's and women's events participated in the competition. The teams were divided into two pools, A and B, each consisting of four teams. Two rounds were held - league matches, and finals.

Men's tournament

Participating nations

Pool A
 
 
 
 

Pool B

Group Stage Matches
 0 - 3 

 1 - 1 

 4 - 3 

 5 - 1 

 5 - 0 

 3 - 0 

 3 - 1 

 3 - 5 

 5 - 0 

 2 - 1 

 4 - 2 

 4 - 2

Knockout stage
Fifth-eighth place classification

 0 - 1 

 4 - 0 

Seventh-eighth place classification

 2 - 3 

Fifth-sixth place classification

 3 - 2 

Semi-finals

 0 - 2 

 4 - 6

Medal matches

 medal match

 2 - 1 

 medal match

 3 - 1

Medallists

Women's tournament

Participating nations

Pool A
 
 
 
 

Pool B

Medallists

External links
 2003 Afro-Asian Games

2003 Afro-Asian Games
2003 in field hockey
2003